Tomas Villum Jensen (born 12 April 1971) is a Danish actor and film director. He has appeared in 29 films and television shows since 1991. He starred in The Boys from St. Petri, which was screened out of competition at the 1992 Cannes Film Festival.

Selected filmography

Actor

Director

References

External links

1971 births
Living people
Danish male film actors
Danish film directors
People from Hundested